Phillips Brook is an  river in Massachusetts that flows through Ashburnham,           
Westminster, and Fitchburg. The river rises from Lake Winnikeag in Ashburnham, flows through Westminster, and meets the Whitman River in Fitchburg to form the North Nashua River.

See also 
 North Nashua River
 Whitman River
 Rivers of Massachusetts

References 
http://www.nashuariverwatershed.org/

Rivers of Massachusetts
Rivers of Worcester County, Massachusetts